Allorge may refer to:

 Lucile Allorge (born 1937), Madagascar-born French botanist
 Pierre Allorge (1891–1944), French botanist
 Valentine Allorge (1888–1977), Russian-French botanist, phycologist, and bryologist; wife of Pierre Allorge